The Lewistown Courthouse Historic District is a  historic district in Lewistown, Montana which was listed on the National Register of Historic Places in 1985.  The listing included 22 contributing buildings.

Its area is roughly bounded by Washington Street, 6th Avenue, Main and Broadway Streets.

It includes the Fergus County Courthouse (1907), houses, the city hall, and the Lewiston Carnegie Library, which is separately NRHP-listed.

Croatian craftsman did much of the construction.

References

Carnegie libraries in Montana
City halls in Montana
Historic districts on the National Register of Historic Places in Montana
National Register of Historic Places in Fergus County, Montana
Victorian architecture in Montana